Astoria is a station of the M2 (East-West) line of the Budapest Metro, under the eponymous square, Astoria.  The station was renovated in 2003–4. It was open on 2 April 1970 as part of the inaugural section of Line M2, between Deák Ferenc tér and Örs vezér tere.

Connections
 Tram
47 Deák Ferenc tér – Városház tér
48 Deák Ferenc tér – Savoya Park
49 Deák Ferenc tér – Kelenföld vasútállomás
 Trolleybus
72M Zugló vasútállomás – Orczy tér
74 Csáktornya park – Károly körút (Astoria)
 Bus: 5, 7, 8E, 9, 100E, 107, 108E, 110, 112, 133E

References

External links

M2 (Budapest Metro) stations
Railway stations opened in 1970